Thurmond House may refer to:

Thurmond House (Siloam Springs, Arkansas), listed on the National Register of Historic Places in Benton County, Arkansas
Thurmond House (Gibsland, Louisiana), listed on the National Register of Historic Places in Louisiana

See also
Thurmond Historic District, Thurmond, West Virginia